Labh Janjua (1957 – 22 October 2015) was an Indian bhangra vocalist and songwriter, best known for his bhangra and hip hop songs, such as "Bair Bura Hunda Jatt da", "Jatt Di Nazar Buri", "Goli Jatt Ne Katcheri'ch Chaloni ", "Jatt Marda", "Soni De Nakhre Sone lagde" (movie Partner) and "Mundian To Bach Ke", which was produced by Panjabi MC in 1998, and re-released in 2002. He has also sung many Bollywood songs, including "Jee Karda" from the 2008 film Singh Is Kinng  and "London Thumakda" from the 2014 film Queen which was one of his most successful songs.

Early life and education
Janjua was born in a Sikh family. He learned music by attending kirtans by his grandfather and he won several prizes for singing in school and college. He is an Alumnus of Mata Gujri College, Fatehgarh Sahib.

He was born and brought up in village Majra, Khanna in the Ludhiana district of Punjab, India. He was a resident of both Mumbai and Khanna City, where he learned music under a well-known local teacher, late Jaswant Bhanwra.

Career
He first shot to fame in 1999, where he provided vocals for the song "Mundian To Bach Ke", which was produced by Panjabi MC and was a huge hit. His Bollywood break appeared in 2007, in the movie Hattrick. Since then he sang numerous songs in movies like Jai Ho, Dev.D, Singh Is Kinng, Garam Masala, Dhol, Krazzy 4 and Singh Is Bliing.

Janjua was found dead at his residence in Bangur Nagar, Goregaon, Mumbai on 22 October 2015.

Discography

Albums
 Hulchul Hogi
 Raatan Toon Lambe Khat
 Bewafa
 Beyond Belief
 Bair Bura Hunda Jatt Da
 Labh Janjua – The King
 Beware of the Boys
 Labh Janjua Live (2 Packs) CD and DVD

Singles and collaborations
 1998 / 2002 – "Mundian To Bach Ke" produced by Punjabi MC
 2008 – "Glastonbury" with Jay-Z
 2015 - Gora Gora Rang featuring Notorious Jatt

Playback singing
 "Heeriye" in Vodka Diaries (2017)
 "Dil Kare Chu Che" in Singh Is Bliing (2015)
 "Jawaani Din Char" in Second Hand Husband (2015) 
 "Thoda Lutf Thoda Ishq" in Thoda Lutf Thoda Ishq (2015)
 "London Thumakada" in Queen (2014)
 "Farukha Baadi" in Luv Shuv Tey Chicken Khurana (2012)
 "Baari barsi" in Band Baaja Baaraat (2010)
 "Jee Karda" and "Talli Hua" in Singh Is Kinng (2008)
 "Dance pe Chance" with Sunidhi Chauhan in Rab Ne Bana Di Jodi (2008)
 "Aag lage aaj kal ke fashion nu" in Haal–e–dil (2008)
 "Pyaar Karke" in Pyaar Ke Side Effects (2006)
 "Chuuriyan" in Money Hai Toh Honey Hai (2008)
 "Ik rupiya" in Krazzy 4 (2008)
 "Man Moniye" in Dil Dosti etc (2007)
 "Chori Chori (male)" in Garam Masala (2005)
 "Mahi Mennu" in Dev.D (2009)
 "Hikknaal" in Dev.D (2009)
 "Soni De Nakhre" in Partner (2007)
 "O Yara Dhol Bajake" in Dhol (2007)
 "Mera Yaar Sharabi" in Labh Janjua Funmusic (2007)

Death
Labh was found dead at his Goregaon residence on the morning of 22 October 2015 (Thursday). While the cause of his death is not known, Bangunagar police have ruled that his death was neither a suicide or murder and no foul play had been detected. Labh was known to suffer from diabetes-related problems, and his body was sent to Bhagwati Hospital for a post-mortem examination.

References

External links
 

1957 births
2015 deaths
Indian male playback singers
Indian male pop singers
Indian male singer-songwriters
Indian singer-songwriters
People from Ludhiana district
Punjabi-language singers
Punjabi people
20th-century Indian singers
Singers from Punjab, India
20th-century Indian male singers